Desautels is a surname. Notable people with the surname include:

 Gene Desautels (1907-1994), American baseball player
 Guillaume Desautels (1529-1599), French poet
 L. Denis Desautels (born 1943), former Auditor General of Canada
 Michel Désautels (born 1951), Canadian writer and journalist
 Richard G. Desautels (1932-1951), United States Army soldier

See also
 Janette Desautel, a fictional chef in the HBO television series Treme